Tonight We'll Dance at Home is a 1972 Romanian comedy film directed by Geo Saizescu.

The film portrays the travels around the country of two sentimental swindlers, Temistocle T. Temistocle (Dem Rădulescu) and Alecu A. Alecu (Sebastian Papaiani), who present themselves as respectable people and ensnare female victims of various ages, from whom they manage to obtain large sums of money in exchange for promises of marriage.

Cast 
 Dem Rădulescu – Temistocle
 Sebastian Papaiani – Alecu
  – Mimi
 Ioana Bulcă – Blonda
 Stela Popescu – Stela
 Draga Olteanu Matei – Lăcrămioara
  – Alice
 Violeta Andrei – Gina
  – Mimi's relative
 Margareta Krauss Silvestrini – Mary 
  – Corina
  – Marioara
 Ștefan Mihăilescu-Brăila – Cristache
  — Suzana Pitulice
 Fory Etterle – Bebe
 Geo Saizescu — Bizarul
 Mircea Mureșan — Stela's husband
 
 
 Gheorghe Naghi
 Temistocle Popa

References

External links 

1972 comedy films
1972 films
Romanian comedy films
1970s Romanian-language films